Geoff James Dixon (born 1939 in Wagga Wagga, New South Wales, Australia) is an Australian corporate executive and former CEO and managing director of Qantas.

Qantas
Geoff Dixon was appointed chief executive officer and managing director of Qantas in March 2001. He was chief executive designate from November 2000, after serving as deputy CEO since November 1998. He was appointed to the board of directors in August 2000. Dixon is a member of the Qantas Safety, Environment and Security Committee and a director of a number of controlled entities of the Qantas Group.

Geoff Dixon's tenure as CEO of Qantas coincided in a period when the aviation industry has been under pressure to remain competitive, with rising fuel and insurance costs. He controversially outsourced a range of business activities to off-shore areas, including in-flight and IT services. He also established the low-cost carrier Jetstar Airways to compete with rival carrier Virgin Blue.

Dixon retired from Qantas and the Qantas board on 28 November 2008. He was succeeded as CEO by Alan Joyce.

Current directorships
Geoff Dixon is a director of the following companies:
 Publishing & Broadcasting Limited
 Fiji Airways

He is chairman of the Garvan Research Foundation, the marketing and fundraising arm to the Garvan Institute of Medical Research.

Former appointments
Dixon is a former director of Leighton Holdings and before joining Qantas, Dixon was director of marketing and industry sales at Ansett Australia and general manager of marketing and corporate affairs at Australian Airlines.

News
He featured as the cover story in the Australian Financial Review magazine on 30 March 2007.

References

Qantas Board

External links
Flying hazards - Geoff Dixon interview (CEO Forum Group)

|-

1939 births
People from Wagga Wagga
Living people
Qantas people
Australian corporate directors
Australian chief executives
20th-century Australian businesspeople
21st-century Australian businesspeople